María Clara Rafols Lorenzo Lobregat (April 26, 1921 – January 2, 2004) was the first female mayor and also a representative to the Philippine Congress of Zamboanga City.

Early life
Lobregat or "" was born April 26, 1921, in the then-municipality of Zamboanga, the second of five children of Don Pablo Lorenzo, who was the mayor of Zamboanga City from 1939 until 1940, a representative to the first Philippine Assembly, and a delegate to the Philippine Constitutional Convention, and Luisa Rafols of Cebu City. Lobregat grew up in the cities of Zamboanga, Cebu, and Manila. She spoke Zamboangueño Chavacano, Cebuano, English, Tagalog, and Spanish.

Education
Lobregat was educated at the Pilar College in Zamboanga City, Maryknoll and St. Scholastica's College in Manila and is the recipient of an  "honoris causa"—Doctor of Humanities from the Ateneo de Davao University in 1979, Doctor in Business Administration from the Aquinas University in 1980, and Doctor in Educational Administration, Western Mindanao State University.

Career
Lobregat was present in Malacañan Palace on October 12, 1936, when President Manuel L. Quezon created and established the chartered city of Zamboanga through the Philippine Commonwealth.

Before 1971, Lobregat, mother of six, was president of the Philippine Coconut Producers Federation (COCOFED).

Throughout her political career, Lobregat lost in only one election – in 1984 for the lone seat at the Batasang Pambansa. Allied with the Marcoses, she lost to Mayor Cesar Climaco who did not assume his post as assemblyman.

With Marcos gone and the then opposition-turned-administration splitting into factions, Lobregat easily won as representative of the Lone District of Zamboanga City in the 1987 legislative elections and was reelected in 1992 and 1995. She ran and won the mayoralty in 1998, was reelected in 2001 and was set to file her certificate of candidacy for a third term on January 5 this year. Her son Celso, has occupied the congressional seat she held from 1987 to 1998. Her nephew, Luis Lorenzo, Jr., was Agriculture Secretary under Gloria Macapagal Arroyo from 2002 to 2004.

Lobregat's net worth as of end of 2002, was P27.8 million, making her the richest Mindanao city mayor.

In her Statement of Assets, Liabilities and Net Worth (SALN) as of end of 2002, Lobregat listed 18 companies where she has "shareholdings" and listed as number 19, "other enterprises (resort and others)" where she also has "shareholdings."

Lobregat's business interests included banking, real estate, flower growing, mining, resort and resort development, recreation, petroleum, etc.

Lobregat, always seen in public wearing kimona and patadyong, was among three female representatives who figured prominently in the protest actions against the creation of the Southern Philippines Council for Peace and Development (SPCPD) in 1996. She, along with then South Cotabato representatives Luwalhati Antonino and Daisy Fuentes, were referred to by the media as “Tres Marias.”

Lobregat was a harsh critic of Moro National Liberation Front chair Nur Misuari, insisted that the controversial coconut levy funds were private funds; campaigned against the inclusion of her city in the Autonomous Region in Muslim Mindanao in the 1989 and 2001 plebiscite; ordered the Filipino deportees from Sabah in 2002 to be “screened” before entering her city, opposed the transfer of the regional seat from Zamboanga City to Pagadian City and was an avid supporter of the joint US-RP military exercise, Balikatan.

Personal life
Lobregat met her husband, Celso Lobregat in a volunteer work at the Remedios Hospital at Malate, Manila. They wed on January 30, 1945, and had six children.
Tragedy struck when her husband was killed in a plane crash in May 1968.
Her first son, Celso Lobregat, became representative to the former lone district of Zamboanga City in 1998 and later the Mayor of Zamboanga City in 2004 until 2013.

Death
She died of cardiac arrest at 11:30 p.m. January 2, 2004, at the Makati Medical Center. Her remains were brought in the Zamboanga Metropolitan Cathedral. Her remains were finally rested at the Manila Memorial Park. She was succeeded by Vice-Mayor Erico Basilio Fabian as Zamboanga City Mayor. Her son, Celso L. Lobregat was elected City Mayor in the 2004 local elections.

References

1921 births
2004 deaths
Cebuano people
People from Zamboanga City
Visayan people
Women members of the House of Representatives of the Philippines
Members of the House of Representatives of the Philippines from Zamboanga City
Women mayors of places in the Philippines
Mayors of Zamboanga City
Laban ng Demokratikong Pilipino politicians
Burials at the Manila Memorial Park – Sucat
20th-century Filipino women politicians
20th-century Filipino politicians